The term "Blue Ox" may refer to:

 Babe the blue ox, a legendary ox owned by Paul Bunyan

See also
 Parochetus, a plant known as blue oxalis